Kevin Twaddle (born 31 October 1971 in Edinburgh) is a Scottish former professional footballer.

A forward, Twaddle began his career with junior club Dunbar United where he made 45 appearances and scored 23 goals. He entered senior football when he signed for St Johnstone in 1994. He remained at McDiarmid Park for two years, making 51 league appearances and finding the net on ten occasions. In 1996, he joined Raith Rovers in an £80,000 deal. He made 32 appearances for Rovers in two years, scoring four goals.

He moved to Morton in 1998 for a fee of £150,000, but his stay at Cappielow was brief. Scottish Premier League club Motherwell signed him later that year, also for £150,000. Twaddle signed for Heart of Midlothian, the club he supported as a boy, in June 2002. He only played eight league games for the Jambos in his twelve months with the Edinburgh side.

In 2003, he joined St Mirren, but again his stay was a short one, and he moved on after making only three appearances. Twaddle joined Scottish junior club Penicuik Athletic in the summer of 2004.

Personal life
Twaddle published an autobiography in 2012 which detailed his gambling addiction which cost him over £1 million; he has since campaigned for changes to the law surrounding gambling advertising.

References

External links

Post War English & Scottish Football League A - Z Player's Transfer Database profile

1971 births
Living people
Scottish footballers
Footballers from Edinburgh
St Johnstone F.C. players
Raith Rovers F.C. players
Greenock Morton F.C. players
Motherwell F.C. players
Ayr United F.C. players
Heart of Midlothian F.C. players
St Mirren F.C. players
Scottish Premier League players
Scottish Football League players
Association football wingers
Scottish Junior Football Association players
Penicuik Athletic F.C. players